Aakrosh is a 2010 Indian Hindi-language action thriller film directed by Priyadarshan and produced by Kumar Mangat Pathak under the banner of Big Screen Entertainer. It stars Ajay Devgan, Akshaye Khanna and Bipasha Basu; while Paresh Rawal and Reema Sen and Sarfaraz khan play the supporting roles. The soundtrack was composed by Pritam with lyrics by Irshad Kamil. The film features cinematography by Thiru, production design by Sabu Cyril and editing by Arun Kumar. Tyag Rajan and R.P Yadav arranged and choreographed the action sequences of the film.
The film was based on news reports of honour killings in India, and has also been described as a remake of the 1988 American film, Mississippi Burning.

Plot
Three medical friends from Delhi go missing in a small village – Jhanjhar. It's two months, and there is no clue about their disappearance. The media and students movement demand action from the authorities. It's then that the government orders a Central Bureau of Investigation enquiry with officers Siddhant Chaturvedi CBI and Pratap Kumar to solve the case. They find it difficult to solve the case as the local police and other authorities are a part of Shool Sena, which is supported by the Home Minister and is responsible for illicit activities. Siddhant and Pratap also face Superintendent of police Ajatshatru Singh IPS, a ruthless police officer who misuses his power. Not only that, even the locals don't support the investigation.

It's with the help of Roshni, who is the daughter of the village head and also very wealthy, and Geeta, who is Ajatshatru's wife and Pratap's former love, that the investigation moves ahead.

The truth behind the missing three friends is revealed by Geeta, who witnessed the killing of these boys by a local politician helped by her husband.

This investigation is filled with many traps and thrills created by Ajatshatru and his colleagues. They try to destroy the name of CBI in a number of ways. The duo also manages to get one of the criminals to believe that the shool sena is trying to kill him, assuming him to be a mole, and that he had better become a government witness for their case. The criminal who intimidated was only guilty of burying the bodies. Things get worse when Ajatshatru learns about his wife Geeta helping CBI. He then beats Geeta brutally with his belt behind closed doors and leaves her hospitalized. Pratap, filled with anger, traps each of the criminals by hacking their respective phones' databases and capturing their illicit activities on CCTV cameras. When it is Ajatshatru's turn, Pratap cuts him with a razor and beats him brutally and mercilessly in a salon behind closed doors. In the end, all the criminals are sentenced to imprisonment. However, the longest sentence doled out was only for ten years and the lightest was for three. Obviously, justice is still blind because there was no sentence passed for the 300 villagers burned alive, the cruel beating of the wife, or the kidnap, abuse, and cutting of the tongue of Jamunia.

But the story does not end there. As everyone is leaving the court, Siddhant slips a revolver into village woman Jamunia's hands, with which she manages to kill all the culprits.

The film ends with Siddhant and Pratap bidding goodbye at the railway station, and Geeta running behind Pratap as he boards the train to leave, with Siddhant watching on.

Cast
 Ajay Devgn as Pratap Kumar
 Akshaye Khanna as Siddhant Chaturvedi CBI
 Bipasha Basu as Geeta Singh
 Reema Sen as Jamunia
 Paresh Rawal as IPS Ajashatru Singh, Geeta's husband 
 Jaideep Ahlawat as Pappu Tiwari
 Pankaj Tripathi as Kishore
 Ashraful Haq as Hukum Lal
 Sameera Reddy in a special appearance in the song "Isak Se Meetha Kuch Bhi"

Music 

The songs featured in the film are composed by Pritam Chakraborty. The background score is composed by veteran Malayalam composer Ouseppachan.

Awards and nominations

2011 Zee Cine Awards

Nominated
Best Actor in a Negative Role – Paresh Rawal.

References

External links
 

2010 films
2010 action thriller films
2010s Hindi-language films
2010s police procedural films
Indian action thriller films
Films set in Uttar Pradesh
Films shot in Daman and Diu
Films shot in Karaikudi
Films directed by Priyadarshan
Films featuring songs by Pritam
Hindi-language action films
Indian detective films
Journalism adapted into films